Edwin Frederick Spinks (August 3, 1902 – October 19, 1982) was a Bermudan cricketer who played first-class cricket for Essex. Spinks was born in Bermuda and died in Orsett.

Spinks made two first-class appearances as a tailender for Essex during the 1926 season, but was unable to make much of a contribution to the team's batting, scoring just two runs in three innings.

References

External links
Fred Spinks at Cricket Archive

1902 births
1982 deaths
Bermudian cricketers
Essex cricketers
People from Orsett